Norman Campbell may refer to:

Norman Campbell (politician) (c. 1804–1859), politician in early South Australia moved to Victoria
Norman Robert Campbell (1880–1949), British physicist and philosopher of science
Norm Campbell (1919–1981), Australian rules footballer
Norman Campbell (director) (1924–2004), Canadian television director and producer
Norman Campbell (footballer) (born 1999), Jamaican footballer
Norman R.C. Campbell, Canadian professor of medicine